Čudovita potovanja Zajca Rona is a novel by Slovenian author Andrej Ivanuša. It was first published in 2002.

See also
List of Slovenian novels

Slovenian novels
2002 novels